"Inside Out" is a 1982 song by the American group Odyssey from their album Happy Together.   It was the group's second highest charting single on the UK Singles Chart, where it peaked at number 3, and was also certified silver in the UK. It was ranked at number 15 among the "Tracks of the Year" for 1982 by NME.

Track listings

7" single 

A - "Inside Out" - 3:44
B - "Love's Alright" - 3:50

12" single 

A - "Inside Out" - 6:20
B - "Love's Alright" - 3:56

Charts

References

External links
 Music Video on YouTube
 Odyssey (2) - Inside Out on Discogs

1982 songs
1982 singles
Odyssey (band) songs
RCA Records singles